David Mdavu Masondo (1950 – 5 July 2015) was a South African singer and drummer. He was the lead vocalist of Mbaqanga group The Soul Brothers.

Career 

His musical career began as a drummer for band formed in KwaZulu-Natal in 1970 the Groovy Boys.
In the early 1970s, the Groovy Boys moved to Johannesburg and met the keyboardist Black Moses Ngwenya and co-founded The Soul Brothers. In 1975, their breakthrough song, "Mshoza Wami", was released. The song was commercially successful, selling 60,000 copies within three months.

In September 2009, Masondo's solo album Nkosi Bathethelele, fused with Gospel elements, was released in South Africa.

Legal issues 
Masondo assaulted his wife Nomsa, and a case was opened. He was arrested on 7 February 2008 at Mofolo Park, Soweto, facing charges for assault and pointing a firearm at his wife.

Personal life 
Masondo died at  Garden City Hospital in Mayfair, Johannesburg, on 5 July 2015, after suffering from fatigue.

References 

1950s births
2015 deaths
20th-century South African male singers
Mbaqanga
People from KwaZulu-Natal